The ARB Project is a free software package for the phylogenetic analysis of rRNA and other biological sequences such as amino acids. It simplifies the import and assembly of genetic sequences from any organisms with the use of an automated aligner. This editing process can be depicted into two subcategories: "Primary Structure Editor" and "Secondary Structure Editor." Comprehensively, this allows the necessary make up for the "Phylogenetic Treeing." The software also allows the visualization of these biological sequences which gives the user a more in depth experience and interaction. This is particularly necessary when comparing phylogeny data from various organisms.

Introduction 
From the authors' own description,
The ARB (from Latin arbor, tree) The ARB program package comprises a variety of directly interacting software tools for sequence database maintenance and analysis which are controlled by a common graphical user interface. Although it was initially designed for ribosomal RNA data, it can be used for any nucleic and amino acid sequence data as well. A central database contains processed (aligned) primary structure data. Any additional descriptive data can be stored in database fields assigned to the individual sequences or linked via local or worldwide networks. A phylogenetic tree visualized in the main window can be used for data access and visualization. The package comprises additional tools for data import and export, sequence alignment, primary and secondary structure editing, profile and filter calculation, phylogenetic analyses, specific hybridization probe design and evaluation and other components for data analysis. Currently, the package is used by numerous working groups worldwide.

References

External links 
 Project homepage

Computational phylogenetics